Abdollahabad (also Romanized as ‘Abdollāhābād; also known as ‘Abdolābād) is a village in Molla Yaqub Rural District, in the Central District of Sarab County, East Azerbaijan Province, Iran. At the 2006 census, its population was 78, in 16 families.

References 

Populated places in Sarab County